Stephen Lewis (17 December 1926 – 12 August 2015), credited early in his career as Stephen Cato, was an English actor, comedian, director, screenwriter and playwright. He is best known for his roles as Inspector Cyril "Blakey" Blake in On the Buses, Clem "Smiler" Hemmingway in Last of the Summer Wine and Harry Lambert in Oh, Doctor Beeching!, although he also appeared in numerous stage and film roles.

Early life 
Lewis was born at All Saints Maternity Hospital in Poplar, London, England. He worked as a bricklayer, electrician's mate and carpenter, and also joined the Merchant Navy, before turning to acting. He was persuaded to go to a performance by the Theatre Workshop, under its director Joan Littlewood. It was common, after these performances, to invite members of the audience to meet the cast. He was invited to an audition, landed the part, and left the sea to become a member of the company.

Stage 
Lewis made his West End theatre debut with the transfer of Brendan Behan's The Hostage in 1958. In 1960 he wrote Sparrers Can't Sing with the Theatre Workshop, which was made into the film Sparrows Can't Sing in 1963, starring Barbara Windsor, Roy Kinnear and Lewis himself, as well as his future On the Buses co-star Bob Grant. He used the surname "Cato" in his early stage career, but after writing Sparrows Can't Sing he was urged by his agent to use his real name.

Television 
From 1969 Lewis starred in his best-remembered role as the gruff inspector Blakey in the British sitcom On the Buses, which ran for 74 episodes and spawned three films: On the Buses (1971), Mutiny on the Buses (1972), and Holiday on the Buses (1973). He co-wrote 12 episodes with fellow star Bob Grant. Lewis was made up to look much older than his actual age with heavy make-up; he was only 42 when the programme began. A spin-off series, Don't Drink the Water (1974–1975), ran for two series. This featured Blakey retiring to Spain with his sister Dorothy (played by Pat Coombs). In the 1990s, Blakey appeared regularly on Jim Davidson's version of The Generation Game on BBC One. In addition, Lewis played a coach driver with very similar characteristics to Blakey in a 2000 edition of ITV's 1970s-set sitcom The Grimleys. He also appeared in Manhunt in a rare villainous role. He and Bob Grant starred in a TV show called Jugg Brothers (1970), but this never got past the pilot episode.

Film 
The films in which Lewis acted included A Prize of Arms (1962), Sparrows Can't Sing (1963) (which he also wrote), Negatives (1968), Staircase (1969, with Richard Burton and Rex Harrison), Some Will, Some Won't (1969), The Magnificent Seven Deadly Sins (1971), The Last Remake of Beau Geste (1977), Personal Services, Out of Order (both 1987), and The Krays (1990). He also appeared in two British sex comedies, Adventures of a Taxi Driver (1975) and Adventures of a Plumber's Mate (1978).

Later television roles 
In 1988, he took on one of his longest-running roles, playing Clem "Smiler" Hemingway in the BBC sitcom Last of the Summer Wine. The character appeared in many episodes for 17 years, until ill health forced Lewis to leave the series in 2007. In 1996, Lewis played Harry Lambert, the signalman, in the BBC pilot of sitcom Oh, Doctor Beeching!, which ran to two further series. He appeared as a guest in sitcoms such as One Foot in the Grave, 2point4 Children, Father, Dear Father and The Grimleys. He also played the character of Alf, a comedy writer, in the second series of The All New Alexei Sayle Show (1995).

Death 
Lewis died at the age of 88 on 12 August 2015, in a nursing home in Wanstead, London, where his sister Connie also resided.

Filmography

References

External links 
 
 Interview with Stephen Lewis

1926 births
2015 deaths
20th-century English male actors
21st-century English male actors
British male comedy actors
British Merchant Navy personnel
British Merchant Navy personnel of World War II
English male comedians
English male film actors
English male stage actors
English male television actors
Male actors from London
People from Poplar, London